Aasmund Halvorsen Vinje (25 July 1851 – 4 December 1917) was a Norwegian farmer, teacher, leader of a police district, civil servant and politician for the Moderate Liberal Party. He served as Minister of Agriculture 1905–1906.

He was mayor of Kopervik from 1884 to 1890 and a member of the Parliament of Norway 1885–1906.

References

List of Ministers from Norwegian Office of the Prime Minister
List of Ministers of Agriculture from Norwegian Government site

1851 births
1917 deaths
Government ministers of Norway
Ministers of Agriculture and Food of Norway
Members of the Storting
Moderate Liberal Party politicians
Mayors of places in Rogaland